Johnny, You're Wanted is a 1956 British crime B-movie, directed by Vernon Sewell and starring John Slater.  The film features famous strongwoman Joan Rhodes performing her stage act. It was based on the 1953 BBC television series of the same name which also starred Slater.

Plot
Johnny (Slater) is a long-distance lorry driver returning to London from a provincial delivery, after having taken in a show by Joan Rhodes on the way.  Late at night he stops to give a lift to an attractive female hitchhiker whose car has broken down and who is in a hurry to get to back to London.  Later, Johnny pulls in to a transport café to make a telephone call and buy a coffee.  When he returns to his truck, the woman is gone.  Assuming that in her hurry she has picked up a lift with another driver, he goes on his way, and a few miles down the road is flagged down by another driver to help with a woman who has been found laid at the roadside.  It turns out that the woman is Johnny's hitchhiker, and that she is dead.

The police soon establish that Johnny was the last person to see the woman alive, and consider him the prime suspect in her murder.  Johnny goes on the run, and tries to find out as much as he can about the woman and why anyone should have wanted her dead, while trying to elude the police.  He soon finds himself caught up in the shady world of drug smuggling and has to use all his wits to bring the real killers to justice.

Cast
 John Slater as Johnny
 Alfred Marks as Marks
 Garry Marsh as Balsamo
 Joan Rhodes as Herself
 Chris Halward as Julie
 Jack Stewart as Inspector Bennett
 John Stuart as Surgeon
 Ann Lynn as Chorine

Critical reception
TV Guide called the film a "well-conceived thriller...The situations and performances are a bit forced, but otherwise interest is easily maintained."

External links

References

1956 films
1956 crime films
British crime films
British black-and-white films
Films directed by Vernon Sewell
1950s English-language films
1950s British films